Trillium foetidissimum, also known as the Mississippi River wakerobin, stinking trillium, or fetid trillium, is a species of flowering plant in the family Melanthiaceae. It is found along the Louisiana–Mississippi border in a variety of habitats.

Trillium foetidissimum is a perennial herbaceous plant that blooms from early March to early April.

Description
The plant is brown colored with horizontal rhizomes and bracts. Leaves are either light or bronze-green in color. Sepals are located above the bracts and are green colored, horizontal, and lanceolate. Petals are erect while apex is acute. Stigma is also erect and dark purple in color but is subulate and fleshy unlike the ovary. The flower is sessile, of a maroon color fading to brown with narrow lanceolate petals. It emits a smell of rotting meat to attract insect pollinators, hence the name. Its leaves are strongly mottled. The flower turns to a purple-brown berry in autumn.

References

External links 
 
 Biodiversity Information Serving Our Nation (BISON) occurrence data and maps for Trillium foetidissimum

foetidissimum
Endemic flora of the United States
Flora of Louisiana
Flora of Mississippi
Least concern flora of the United States